Eumesocampa is a genus of two-pronged bristletails in the family Campodeidae. There are at least two described species in Eumesocampa.

Species
These two species belong to the genus Eumesocampa:
 Eumesocampa danielsi Silvestri, 1933 i c g
 Eumesocampa lutzi Silvestri, 1933 i c g
Data sources: i = ITIS, c = Catalogue of Life, g = GBIF, b = Bugguide.net

References

Further reading

 
 
 

Diplura